The following highways are numbered 46A:

 Florida State Road 46A (former)
 New York State Route 46A (former)

See also
A46 (disambiguation)
List of highways numbered 46